Ernst B. Thommen (23 January 1899 – 14 May 1967) was the acting (interim) FIFA president from March 1961 to 28 September 1961. He spent 6 months in office, succeeding Arthur Drewry who died in office.

Thommen contested for the president position when he was the acting president, but lost in the first round voting to Stanley Rous. In the second round he withdrew from contesting.

Thommen was a FIFA member from Switzerland. He had served as chairman of the Organising Committee during the 1954, 1958 and 1962 FIFA World Cups as acting president then, his service in the FIFA governing body was great and was succeeded by Stanley Rous.

Thommen died in 1967 in a car accident.

Notes

Citations

External links 
 
 
 
 

1899 births
1967 deaths
Presidents of FIFA
Commanders Crosses of the Order of Merit of the Federal Republic of Germany
International Olympic Committee members
Recipients of the Olympic Order
Swiss public relations people
Swiss sports executives and administrators
Swiss Roman Catholics